Zenyatta Mondatta (stylised as Zenyattà Mondatta on the album cover artwork) is the third studio album by English rock band the Police, released on 3 October 1980 by A&M Records. It was co-produced by the band and Nigel Gray.

Zenyatta Mondatta reached number one on the UK Albums Chart and number five on the US Billboard 200. It produced the hit singles "Don't Stand So Close to Me" and "De Do Do Do, De Da Da Da". The album won the band two Grammy Awards: Best Rock Performance by a Duo or Group with Vocal for "Don't Stand So Close to Me" and Best Rock Instrumental Performance for "Behind My Camel".

Recording
Zenyatta Mondatta was written during the Police's second tour and recorded in four weeks (minus several days for concerts in Ireland and at the Milton Keynes festival in the United Kingdom). The band members have often expressed disappointment over the album, going so far as to re-record two songs during a brief, unsuccessful reunion in 1986. Drummer Stewart Copeland said about the time pressures: "We had bitten off more than we could chew. ... we finished the album at 4 a.m. on the day we were starting our next world tour. We went to bed for a few hours and then traveled down to Belgium for the first gig. It was cutting it very fine."

The band had wanted to record the album at Surrey Sound, the recording site of their first two albums, but could not record at any British studio for tax reasons. They were, however, able to retain Nigel Gray as their co-producer, bringing him with them to Wisseloord Studios in the Netherlands. Feeling that he had played a significant part in the Police's first two albums, Gray negotiated for a £25,000 fee, which brought the album's total budget to £35,000 (more than twice the combined budgets of their first two albums, but still exceptionally cheap for a band who at that point had become established stars).

As mentioned by Copeland, the Police embarked on a tour of the world the day of the album's completion, beginning in Belgium and finishing in Australia.

Composition
The album is the last of the Police's early era, influenced by reggae and punk and featuring few musical elements on top of the core guitar, bass, and drums.

The record has two instrumentals, "The Other Way of Stopping" (named from a line in Bob Newhart's "The Driving Instructor" routine) and "Behind My Camel". "Behind My Camel" was guitarist Andy Summers' first entirely self-penned composition. As bassist and vocalist Sting refused to play on it, Summers recorded the bass line himself, overdubbing the guitar parts. According to Sting, "I hated that song so much that, one day when I was in the studio, I found the tape lying on the table. So I took it around the back of the studio and actually buried it in the garden." Nigel Gray believed that the title was an in-joke by Summers: "He didn't tell me this himself but I'm 98% sure the reason is this: what would you find behind a camel? A monumental pile of shit."

"Bombs Away" was recorded on a tape that Nigel Gray had just used with Siouxsie and the Banshees. Copeland said that "when he first set up his home studio he got hold of a load of second hand tape which included some stuff by Siouxsie and the Banshees. 'Bombs Away' was written on a Siouxsie and the Banshees backing track. I changed the speed and did things to the EQ to change the drum pattern. So with the desk I can get my song playing, then press a switch and there's Siouxsie singing away."

Zenyatta Mondatta also saw the band's lyrics turning towards political events, with Sting's "Driven to Tears" commenting on poverty and Copeland's "Bombs Away" referring to the Soviet invasion of Afghanistan. These themes became more prevalent on the Police's next album, Ghost in the Machine.

Title
Stewart Copeland said that the group arrived at the album's title after deciding it should roll off the tongue. "Zenyatta" and "Mondatta" are invented words, hinting at Zen, at Jomo Kenyatta, at the French word for the world ("le monde"), and at "Reggatta", from the title of the previous Police album, Reggatta de Blanc. As Copeland explained:

Jerry Moss, co-founder of A&M Records, named the champion racehorse Zenyatta (b. 2004) after the album. Blizzard Entertainment also named a character Zenyatta (and his brother, non-playable character – Mondatta) in the hit game Overwatch. Additionally, in the English translation of the manga Stardust Crusaders published by VIZ Media, the characters Oingo and Boingo are renamed to Zenyatta and Mondatta due to copyright laws.

Release
Zenyatta Mondatta debuted at number one on the UK Albums Chart and stayed atop the chart for four weeks. The album also charted at number one in Australia. In the United States, it spent almost three years on the Billboard 200 chart and peaked at number five. The album produced two singles, "Don't Stand So Close to Me" and "De Do Do Do, De Da Da Da". On the UK Singles Chart, the former became the band's third number one, while the latter reached number five. The two singles also became the band's first top ten hits on the US Billboard Hot 100, with both peaking at number ten on the chart.

A&M Records first remastered the album for release in compact disc format in the US in 1990. Frank DeLuna and Marv Bornstein mastered the original 1980 vinyl LP, but it is unclear if they also remastered the CD.

Sting would later perform his own version of "Shadows in the Rain" on his 1985 debut solo album The Dream of the Blue Turtles. In 1986, the Police re-recorded "Don't Stand So Close to Me" and "De Do Do Do, De Da Da Da". The former was released on Every Breath You Take: The Singles, while the latter was released on the DTS version of Every Breath You Take: The Classics. "When the World Is Running Down, You Make the Best of What's Still Around" was remixed by the production duo Different Gear and released as a single in 2000, credited to "Different Gear vs. The Police". It reached number 28 on the UK Singles Chart.

Critical reception

In a 1980 review for Rolling Stone, David Fricke praised Zenyatta Mondatta as "near-perfect pop by a band that bends all the rules and sometimes makes musical mountains out of molehill-size ideas", complimenting the band's "elastic" interplay. Phil Sutcliffe of Sounds wrote that he initially viewed the album as inferior to the band's earlier material, but came to recognise its strength, despite still finding it somewhat unadventurous: "By word and note it's as articulate and literate as you might hope. It avoids a whole catalogue of megastar pitfalls. Zenyatta is not pretentious, not bombastic, not lazy." In Smash Hits, David Hepworth opined that Sting had particularly improved as a vocalist and songwriter, describing his compositions as "tougher, more concerned, but no less melodic."

Zenyatta Mondatta was voted the 28th best album of 1980 in The Village Voices year-end Pazz & Jop critics' poll. At the Grammy Awards in 1982, "Don't Stand So Close to Me" won for Best Rock Performance by a Duo or Group with Vocal, while "Behind My Camel" won for Best Rock Instrumental Performance, marking the Police's second consecutive win in the latter category.

Retrospectively, AllMusic critic Greg Prato cited Zenyatta Mondatta as "arguably the best Police album" and "one of the finest rock albums of all time." In 2004's The New Rolling Stone Album Guide, J. D. Considine highlighted the more pronounced groove of the music: "The emphasis on rhythmic intensity made the songs catchier (as 'Voices Inside My Head' shows, the band certainly knew how to work a vamp), and the rhythmic dynamics add a singular punch to the material."

The singer Bilal names it among his 25 favourite albums, citing its fusion of rock, reggae, and dub music.

Track listing

Personnel
Credits are adapted from the album's liner notes.

The Police
 Sting – bass guitar (all but 8), lead and backing vocals, synthesizers
 Andy Summers – guitar, backing vocals, piano (4), synthesizers (8), bass guitar (8)
 Stewart Copeland – drums, backing vocals

Production
 Nigel Gray – production, engineering
 The Police – production
 Marv Bornstein – mastering
 Frank DeLuna – mastering
 Watal Asanuma – back cover and inner sleeve photography
 Janette Beckman – front cover and inner sleeve photography
 Adrian Boot – inner sleeve photography
 Miles Copeland – back cover and inner sleeve photography
 Anton Corbijn – inner sleeve photography
 Danny Quatrochi – back cover and inner sleeve photography
 Michael Ross – art direction, design, inner sleeve photography
 Simon Ryan – design
 Gabor Scott – inner sleeve photography
 Akihiro Takayama – inner sleeve photography
 Kim Turner – inner sleeve photography

Charts

Weekly charts

Year-end charts

Certifications and sales

References

The Police albums
1980 albums
A&M Records albums
Albums produced by Nigel Gray